Pine Creek is an unincorporated community and census-designated place (CDP) in Park County, Montana, United States. It is in the central part of the county, on the east side of the Paradise Valley, where Pine Creek joins the Yellowstone River.

Montana Secondary Highway 540 (East River Road) passes the community, leading southwest  to Pray and north the same distance to Livingston, the Park county seat. Pine Creek Road leads west across the Yellowstone River  to U.S. Route 89, the main highway through the Paradise Valley.

Pine Creek was first listed as a CDP prior to the 2020 census.

Demographics

References 

Census-designated places in Park County, Montana
Census-designated places in Montana